Zeuxidamus can refer to two ancient Spartans.
A king of Sparta, and 10th of the Eurypontid dynasty. He was grandson of Theopompus, son of Anaxandridas I, and father of Anaxidamus, who succeeded him.

A son of Leotychides, king of Sparta. He was also named Cyniscus (Κυνίσκος). He died before his father, leaving a son, Archidamus II

Notes

References

7th-century BC rulers
7th-century BC Spartans
Eurypontid kings of Sparta